HMS K3 was the lead ship of the British K-class submarines. She was laid down on 21 May 1915 by Vickers, Barrow-in-Furness. She was commissioned on 4 August 1916.

In December 1916, K3, with the future King George VI aboard, 
uncontrollably dived. The ship plunged to 150 feet with the stern and propellers raised above the waves. It took twenty minutes to free the ship from the sea bed mud and surface successfully.

On 9 January 1917, K3’s boiler room was flooded in the North Sea. K3 was also involved in the "Battle of May Island" in 1918. On 2 May 1918, K3 yet again uncontrollably dived to 266 feet which crushed part of the hull.

K3 was sold on 26 October 1921 to the Barking Ship Breaking Company for scrapping in London.

References
 
 

 

Ships built in Barrow-in-Furness
British K-class submarines
1916 ships
Royal Navy ship names